Cover You is the first cover and tribute album by the J-pop idol group Morning Musume, released on November 26, 2008. The album features songs by Yū Aku for the duo Pink Lady and other musicians. The first-press edition comes in a three-spined case with an alternate cover.

Track listing

Oricon ranks and sales

References

External links 
 Cover You entry at Up-Front Works official website 
 Cover You entry on Oricon Style 

Morning Musume albums
Zetima albums
2008 albums